Agnatic male descendants born inside legitimate marriages - both dynastic and morganatic - of Elimar I, Count of Oldenburg of the House of Oldenburg:

 Elimar I, Count of Oldenburg (1040–1108)
 Elimar II, Count of Oldenburg (1070–1142)
 Henry I of Oldenburg, Count of Wildeshausen (1102–1167)
 Gerard of Oldenburg, Prince Archbishop of Bremen and Hamburg and Osnabrück († 1219)
 Henry II, Count of Wildeshausen († 1197)
 Henry  III of Oldenburg, Count of Bruchhausen († 1234)
 Henry V, Count of New Bruchhausen and Wildeshausen († 1270)
 Gerhard I, Count of New Bruchhausen and Wildeshausen († 1310)
 Burchard of Oldenburg, Canon of Verdun († 1262)
 Ludolf, Count of Old Bruchhausen († 1278)
 Otto, Count of Old Bruchhausen († 1298)
 Wilbrand of Oldenburg, Prince Bishop of Utrecht and Paderborn († 1233)
 Egilmar of Oldenburg, Canon of Münster († 1217)
 Burchard of Oldenburg, Count of Wildeshausen († 1233)
 Henry IV of Oldenburg, Count of Wildeshausen (1233–1271)
 Wulbrand of Oldenburg († 1230)
 Ludolph of Oldenburg, Canon of Utrecht († 1279)
 Otto of Oldenburg, Prince Bishop of Münster († 1218)
 Christian I, Count of Oldenburg († 1167)
 Maurice, Count of Oldenburg (1145–1211)
 Otto I, Count of Oldenburg (1175–1251)
 Henry of Oldenburg († 1255)
 Christian II, Count of Oldenburg (1184–1233)
 John I, Count of Oldenburg (1204–1270)
 Christian III, Count of Oldenburg (1234–1285)
 John II, Count of Oldenburg (1272–1315)
 Christian IV, Count of Oldenburg († 1334)
 John III, Count of Oldenburg († 1344)
 John IV, Count of Oldenburg († 1356)
 Conrad of Oldenburg († 1357)
 Otto of Oldenburg (1356–1357)
 Christian of Oldenburg († 1368)
 Wilhelm of Oldenburg (1331–1367)
 Otto of Oldenburg (1331–1345)
 Conrad I, Count of Oldenburg (1300–1347)
 Christian V, Count of Oldenburg (1342–1399)
 Christian VI, Count of Oldenburg (1394–1421)
 Dietrich, Count of Oldenburg (1390–1440)
 King Christian I of Denmark (1426–1481)
 Prince Olav of Denmark (1450–1451)
 Prince Canute of Denmark (1451–1455)
 King John of Denmark (1455–1513)
 Prince John of Denmark (1479–1480)
 Prince Ernest of Denmark (1480-1500)
 King Christian II of Denmark (1481–1559)
 Prince Christian of Denmark (1516)
 Prince John of Denmark (1518–1531)
 Prince Maximilian of Denmark (1519)
 Prince Philip Ferdinan of Denmark (1519–1520)
 Prince Jacob of Denmark (1484–1566)
 Prince Francis of Denmark (1497–1511)
 King Frederick I of Denmark (1471–1533)
 King Christian III of Denmark (1503–1559)
 King Frederick II of Denmark (1534–1588)
 King Christian IV of Denmark (1577–1648)
 Prince Friedrich of Denmark (1599)
 Prince Christian of Denmark (1603–1647)
 King Frederick III of Denmark (1577–1648)
 King Christian V of Denmark (1646–1699)
 King Frederick IV of Denmark (1646–1699)
 Prince Christian of Denmark (1697–1698)
 King Christian VI of Denmark (1646–1699)
 King Frederick V of Denmark (1723–1766)
 Prince Christian of Denmark (1745–1747)
 King Christian VII of Denmark (1749–1808)
 King Frederick VI of Denmark (1768–1839)
 Prince Christian of Denmark (1791)
 Prince Christian of Denmark (1797)
 Prince Frederick of Denmark (1753–1805)
 King Christian VIII of Denmark (1786–1848)
 Prince Christian Friedrich of Denmark (1807)
 King Frederick VII of Denmark (1808–1863)
 Prince Ferdinand of Denmark (1792–1863)
 Prince Frederik Charles of Denmark (1701–1702)
 Prince George of Denmark (1703–1704)
 Prince Frederik Christian of Denmark (1726–1727)
 Prince Charles  of Denmark (1728–1729)
 Prince Christian William of Denmark (1672–1673)
 Prince Christian of Denmark (1675–1695)
 Prince Charles of Denmark (1680–1729)
 Prince William of Denmark (1687–1705)
 Prince Frederick of Denmark (1651–1652)
 Prince George, Duke of Cumberland (1651–1652)
 Prince William, Duke of Gloucester (1689–1700)
 Prince George of Cumberland (1692)
 Prince Ulrik of Denmark, Prince Bishop of Schwerin (1611–1633)
 Count Valdemar Christian of Schleswig-Holstein (1622–1656)
 Count Friedrich Christian of Schleswig-Holstein (1625–1627)
 Prince Ulrik of Denmark, Prince Bishop of Schwerin and Bishop of Schleswig
 Prince John of Denmark (1545–1622)
 King Magnus of Livonia (1540–1583)
 John II, Duke of Schleswig-Holstein-Sonderburg (1545–1622)
 Christian, Duke of Schleswig-Holstein-Sonderburg-Ærø (1570–1633)
 Alexander, Duke of Schleswig-Holstein-Sonderburg (1573–1627)
 Johann Christian, Duke of Schleswig-Holstein-Sonderburg (1607–1653)
 Prince Johann Friedrich of Schleswig-Holstein (1639–1649)
 Christian Adolf I, Duke of Schleswig-Holstein-Sonderburg-Franzhagen (1641–1702)
 Leopold Christian, Duke of Schleswig-Holstein-Sonderburg-Franzhagen (1678–1707)
Christian Ludwig of Schleswig-Holstein-Sonderburg-Franzhagen (1704)
Leopold Karl of Schleswig-Holstein-Sonderburg-Franzhagen (1705–1737)
Christian Adolf of Schleswig-Holstein-Sonderburg-Franzhagen (1706–1711)
 Ludwig Karl, Duke of Schleswig-Holstein-Sonderburg-Franzhagen (1684–1708)
 Christian Adolph II, Duke of Schleswig-Holstein-Sonderburg-Franzhagen (1708–1709)
 Prince Johann Franz of Schleswig-Holstein-Sonderburg-Franzhagen (1685–1687)
 Prince Alexander Heinrich of Schleswig-Holstein-Sonderburg (1608–1667)
Ferdinand Leopold of Schleswig-Holstein-Sonderburg (1647–1702)
Alexander Rudolf of Schleswig-Holstein-Sonderburg (1651–1727)
Georg Christian of Schleswig-Holstein-Sonderburg (1653–1696)
Leopold of Schleswig-Holstein-Sonderburg (1657–1658)
 Ernest Günther of Schleswig-Holstein-Sonderburg-Augustenburg (1609–1689) 
 Frederick, Duke of Schleswig-Holstein-Sonderburg-Augustenburg (1652–1692)
 Prince Philip Ernst of Schleswig-Holstein-Sonderburg-Augustenburg (1655–1677)
 Ernest August, Duke of Schleswig-Holstein-Sonderburg-Augustenburg (1660–1731)
 Prince Frederick William of Schleswig-Holstein-Sonderburg-Augustenburg (1668–1714)
 Christian August I, Duke of Schleswig-Holstein-Sonderburg-Augustenburg (1696–1754)
 Frederick Christian I, Duke of Schleswig-Holstein-Sonderburg-Augustenburg (1721–1794) 
 Frederick Christian II, Duke of Schleswig-Holstein-Sonderburg-Augustenburg (1765–1814)
 Christian August II, Duke of Schleswig-Holstein-Sonderburg-Augustenburg (1798–1869)
 Prince Alexander Friedrich Georg of Schleswig-Holstein-Sonderburg-Augustenburg (1821–1823)
 Frederick VIII, Duke of Schleswig-Holstein (1829–1880)
 Prince Friedrich of Schleswig-Holstein (1857–1858)
 Prince Gerhard of Schleswig-Holstein (1862)
 Ernst Gunther, Duke of Schleswig-Holstein (1863–1921)
 Prince Christian of Schleswig-Holstein (1831–1917)
 Prince Christian Victor of Schleswig-Holstein (1867–1900)
 Albert, Duke of Schleswig-Holstein (1869–1931)
 Prince Frederick Harald of Schleswig-Holstein (1876)
 Prince Friedrich Emil August of Noer (1800–1865)
 Count Friedrich Christian Karl August of Noer (1830–1881)
 Count Christian Emil August of Noer (1832–1834)
 Prince Friedrich Karl Emil of Schleswig-Holstein-Sonderburg-Augustenburg (1767–1841)
 Prince Friedrich August Emil of Schleswig-Holstein-Sonderburg-Augustenburg (1802–1843)
 Prince Georg Erich of Schleswig-Holstein-Sonderburg-Augustenburg (1805–1849)
 Prince August of Schleswig-Holstein-Sonderburg-Augustenburg (1805–1807)
 Prince Julius of Schleswig-Holstein-Sonderburg-Augustenburg (1807)
 Prince Heinrich Karl Woldemar of Schleswig-Holstein-Sonderburg-Augustenburg (1810–1871)
 Charles August, Crown Prince of Sweden (1768–1810)
 Prince Karl Wilhelm of Schleswig-Holstein-Sonderburg-Augustenburg (1770–1771)
 Prince Emil August of Schleswig-Holstein-Sonderburg-Augustenburg (1722–1786)
 Prince Christian Ulrich of Schleswig-Holstein-Sonderburg-Augustenburg (1723)
 Prince Friedrich Karl of Schleswig-Holstein-Sonderburg-Augustenburg (1701–1702)
 Prince Georg Friedrich of Schleswig-Holstein-Sonderburg (1611–1676)
 August Philipp, Duke of Schleswig-Holstein-Sonderburg-Beck (1612–1675)
 August, Duke of Schleswig-Holstein-Sonderburg-Beck (1652–1689)
 Frederick William I, Duke of Schleswig-Holstein-Sonderburg-Beck (1682-1719)
 Frederick Louis, Duke of Schleswig-Holstein-Sonderburg-Beck(1653–1728)
 Frederick William II, Duke of Schleswig-Holstein-Sonderburg-Beck (1687-1749)
 Frederick William III, Duke of Schleswig-Holstein-Sonderburg-Beck (1723–1757)
 Prince Frederick Louis of Schleswig-Holstein-Sonderburg-Beck (1688)
 Charles Louis, Duke of Schleswig-Holstein-Sonderburg-Beck (1690-1774)
 Duke Karl Frederick of Schleswig-Holstein-Sonderburg-Beck (1732-1772) 
 Prince Philip William of Schleswig-Holstein-Sonderburg-Beck (1693-1729)
 Peter August, Duke of Schleswig-Holstein-Sonderburg-Beck (1697–1775)
 Prince Karl of Schleswig-Holstein-Sonderburg-Beck (1724–1726)
 Prince Karl Anton August of Schleswig-Holstein-Sonderburg-Beck (1727–1759)
 Friedrich Karl Ludwig, Duke of Schleswig-Holstein-Sonderburg-Beck (1757–1816)
 Friedrich Wilhelm, Duke of Schleswig-Holstein-Sonderburg-Beck-Glücksburg (1785–1831)
 Karl, Duke of Schleswig-Holstein-Sonderburg-Glücksburg (1813–1878)
 Friedrich, Duke of Schleswig-Holstein-Sonderburg-Glücksburg (1814–1885)
 Frederick Ferdinand, Duke of Schleswig-Holstein (1855–1934)
 William Frederick, Duke of Schleswig-Holstein (1891–1965)
 John Albert, Duke of Schleswig-Holstein (1917–1944)
 Prince William Alfred of Schleswig-Holstein (1919–1926)
 Peter, Duke of Schleswig-Holstein (1922–1980)
 Christoph, Prince of Schleswig-Holstein (b. 1949)
 Friedrich Ferdinand, Hereditary Prince of Schleswig-Holstein (b. 1985)
 Prince Constantin of Schleswig-Holstein (b. 1986)
 Prince Leopold of Schleswig-Holstein (b. 1991)
 Prince Alexander of Schleswig-Holstein (b. 1953)
 Prince Julian of Schleswig-Holstein (b. 1997)
 Prince Albrecht of Schleswig-Holstein-Sonderburg-Glücksburg (1863–1948)
 Prince Friedrich Wilhelm of Schleswig-Holstein-Sonderburg-Glücksburg (1909–1940)
 Prince Johann Georg of Schleswig-Holstein-Sonderburg-Glücksburg (1911–1941)
 Prince Friedrich Ferdinand of Schleswig-Holstein-Sonderburg-Glücksburg (1913–1989)
 Prince Wilhelm of Schleswig-Holstein-Sonderburg-Glücksburg (1816–1893)
 King Christian IX of Denmark (1818–1906)
 King Frederick VIII of Denmark (1843–1912)
 King Christian X of Denmark (1870–1947)
 King Frederick IX of Denmark (1899–1972)
 Knud, Hereditary Prince of Denmark (1900–1976)
 Count Ingolf of Rosenborg (b. 1940)
 Count Christian of Rosenborg (1942–2013)
 King Haakon VII of Norway (1872–1957)
 King Olav V of Norway (1903–1991)
 King Harald V of Norway (b. 1937)
 Haakon, Crown Prince of Norway (b. 1973)
 Prince Sverre Magnus of Norway (b. 2005)
 Prince Harald of Denmark (1876–1949)
 Prince Gorm of Denmark (1919–1991)
 Count Oluf of Rosenborg (1923–1990)
 Count Ulrik Harald Gunnar Oluf of Rosenborg (b. 1950)
 Count Philip Oluf Axel Ulrik of Rosenborg (b. 1986)
 Prince Gustav of Denmark (1887–1944)
 King George I of Greece (1845–1913)
 King Constantine I of Greece (1868–1923)
 King George II of Greece (1890–1947)
 King Alexander I of Greece (1893–1920)
 King Paul I of Greece (1901–1964)
 King Constantine II of Greece (b. 1940)
 Pavlos, Crown Prince of Greece (b. 1967)
 Prince Constantine Alexios of Greece and Denmark (b. 1998)
 Prince Achileas-Andreas of Greece and Denmark (b. 2000)
 Prince Odysseas-Kimon of Greece and Denmark (b. 2004)
 Prince Aristide Stavros of Greece and Denmark (b. 2008)
 Prince Nikolaos of Greece and Denmark (b. 1969)
 Prince Philippos of Greece and Denmark (b. 1986)
 Prince George of Greece and Denmark (1869–1957)
 Prince Peter of Greece and Denmark (1908–1980)
 Prince Nicholas of Greece and Denmark (1872–1938)
 Prince Andrew of Greece and Denmark (1882–1944)
 Prince Philip, Duke of Edinburgh (1921–2021)
 King Charles III (b. 1948)
 William, Prince of Wales (b. 1982)
 Prince George of Wales (b. 2013)
 Prince Louis of Wales (b. 2018)
 Prince Harry, Duke of Sussex (b. 1984)
 Prince Archie of Sussex (b. 2019)
 Prince Andrew, Duke of York (b. 1960)
 Prince Edward, Duke of Edinburgh (b. 1964)
 The Earl of Wessex (b. 2007)
 Prince Christopher of Greece and Denmark (1888–1940)
 Prince Michael of Greece and Denmark (b. 1939)
 Prince Valdemar of Denmark (1858–1939)
 Prince Aage, Count of Rosenborg (1887–1940)
 Count Valdemar of Rosenborg (1915–1995)
 Prince Axel of Denmark (1888–1964)
 Prince George Valdemar of Denmark (1920–1986)
 Count Flemming Valdemar of Rosenborg (1922–2002)
 Count Axel of Rosenborg (b. 1950)
 Count Carl Johan of Rosenborg (b. 1979)
 Count Alexander Flemming of Rosenborg (b. 1993)
 Count Birger of Rosenborg (b. 1950)
 Count Carl Johan of Rosenborg (b. 1952)
 Prince Erik, Count of Rosenborg (1890–1950)
 Count Christian Edward of Rosenborg (1932–1997)
 Count Valdemar Christian of Rosenborg (b. 1965)
 Count Nicolai Christian Valdemar of Rosenborg (b. 1997)
 Prince Viggo, Count of Rosenborg (1893–1970)
 Prince Julius of Schleswig-Holstein-Sonderburg-Glücksburg (1824–1903)
 Prince Johann of Schleswig-Holstein-Sonderburg-Glücksburg (1825–1911)
 Prince Nikolaus of Schleswig-Holstein-Sonderburg-Glücksburg (1828–1849)
 Prince Peter of Schleswig-Holstein-Sonderburg-Beck (1743–1751)
 Prince Alexander of Schleswig-Holstein-Sonderburg-Beck (1744)
 Prince Maximilian Wilhelm of Schleswig-Holstein-Sonderburg-Beck (1664–1692)
 Prince Anton Günther of Schleswig-Holstein-Sonderburg-Beck (1666–1744)
 Prince Ernst Kasimir of Schleswig-Holstein-Sonderburg-Beck (1668–1695)
 Prince Karl Gustav of Schleswig-Holstein-Sonderburg-Beck (1672)
 Prince Adolf of Schleswig-Holstein-Sonderburg (1613–1616)
 Prince Wilhelm Anton of Schleswig-Holstein-Sonderburg (1616)
 Philip Louis, Duke of Schleswig-Holstein-Sonderburg-Wiesenburg
 Friedrich, Duke of Schleswig-Holstein-Sonderburg-Wiesenburg (1651–1724)
 Leopold, Duke of Schleswig-Holstein-Sonderburg-Wiesenburg (1674–1744)
 Prince Georg Wilhelm of Schleswig-Holstein-Sonderburg-Wiesenburg(1652)
 Prince Karl Ludwig of Schleswig-Holstein-Sonderburg-Wiesenburg(1654–1690)
 Prince Johann Georg of Schleswig-Holstein-Sonderburg-Wiesenburg(1658)
 Prince Leopold Georg of Schleswig-Holstein-Sonderburg-Wiesenburg(1660)
 Prince Wilhelm Christian of Schleswig-Holstein-Sonderburg-Wiesenburg(1661–1711)
 Prince August of Schleswig-Holstein-Sonderburg (1574–1596)
 John Adolph, Duke of Schleswig-Holstein-Sønderburg-Norburg (1576–1624)
 Frederick, Duke of Schleswig-Holstein-Sønderburg-Norburg (1581–1658)
 Johann Bogislaw, Duke of Schleswig-Holstein-Norburg (1629–1679)
 Prince Christian August of Schleswig-Holstein-Sonderburg-Norburg (1639–1687)
 Prince Rudolf Friedrich of Schleswig-Holstein-Sonderburg-Norburg (1645–1688) 
 Prince Karl of Schleswig-Holstein-Sonderburg-Norburg (1681–1682)
 Prince Ernst Leopold von Schleswig-Holstein-Sonderburg-Norburg (1685–1722)
 Philip, Duke of Schleswig-Holstein-Sonderburg-Glücksburg
 Prince Johann of Schleswig-Holstein-Glücksburg (1625-1640)
 Prince Franz of Schleswig-Holstein-Glücksburg (1626-1651)
 Christian, Duke of Schleswig-Holstein-Glücksburg (1627-1698)
 Prince Friedrich August of Schleswig-Holstein-Glücksburg (1664)
 Philipp Ernst, Duke of Schleswig-Holstein-Glücksburg (1673-1729)
 Friedrich, Duke of Schleswig-Holstein-Sonderburg-Glücksburg (1701–1766)
 Friedrich Heinrich Wilhelm, Duke of Schleswig-Holstein-Sonderburg-Glücksburg (1747–1779)
 Prince Simon Ludwig of Schleswig-Holstein-Glücksburg (1756–1760)
 Prince Christian Philip of Schleswig-Holstein-Glücksburg (1702–1703)
 Prince Karl Ernst of Schleswig-Holstein-Glücksburg (1706–1761)
 Prince Christian Ernst of Schleswig-Holstein-Glücksburg (1724–1726)
 Prince Karl Albrecht of Schleswig-Holstein-Glücksburg (11 September 1629 - 26 November 1631)
 Prince Adolf of Schleswig-Holstein-Glücksburg (21 October 1631 - 7 February 1658)
 Prince Albrecht of Schleswig-Holstein-Sonderburg (1585–1613)
 Prince Johann Georg of Schleswig-Holstein-Sonderburg (1594–1613)
 Joachim Ernst, Duke of Schleswig-Holstein-Sonderburg-Plön (1595–1671)
 Johann Adolf, Duke of Schleswig-Holstein-Sonderburg-Plön (1634–1704)
 Adolf August, Duke of Schleswig-Holstein-Sonderburg-Plön (1680–1704)
 Leopold August, Duke of Schleswig-Holstein-Sonderburg-Plön (1702–1706)
 Prince Joachim Ernst of Schleswig-Holstein-Sonderburg-Plön (1681–1682)
 Prince Johann Ulrich of Schleswig-Holstein-Sonderburg-Plön (1684)
 Prince Christian Karl of Schleswig-Holstein-Sonderburg-Plön (1690–1704)
 Prince August of Schleswig-Holstein-Sonderburg-Plön (1635–1699)
 Joachim Friedrich, Duke of Schleswig-Holstein-Sonderburg-Plön (1668–1722)
 Prince Christian Charles of Schleswig-Holstein-Sonderburg-Plön-Norburg (1674–1706)
 Friedrich Karl, Duke of Schleswig-Holstein-Sonderburg-Plön (1706–1761)
 Prince Christian Karl of Schleswig-Holstein-Sonderburg-Plön (1738–1740)
 Prince Joachim Ernst of Schleswig-Holstein-Sonderburg-Plön (1637–1700)
 Prince Jakob August Renatus of Schleswig-Holstein-Sonderburg-Plön (1682)
 Prince Johann Ernst Ferdinand of Schleswig-Holstein-Sonderburg-Plön (1684–1729)
 Prince Bernhard of Schleswig-Holstein-Sonderburg-Plön (1639–1676)
 Prince Karl Heinrich of Schleswig-Holstein-Sonderburg-Plön (1642–1655)
 Prince Bernhard of Schleswig-Holstein-Sonderburg (1601)
 John II, Duke of Schleswig-Holstein-Haderslev (1521–1580)
 Adolf, Duke of Schleswig-Holstein-Gottorp (1526–1586)
 Frederick II, Duke of Schleswig-Holstein-Gottorp (1568–1587)
 Philip, Duke of Schleswig-Holstein-Gottorp (1570–1590)
 John Adolf, Duke of Schleswig-Holstein-Gottorp (1575–1616)
 Frederick III, Duke of Schleswig-Holstein-Gottorp (1597–1659)
 Prince Johann Adolf of Schleswig-Holstein-Gottorp (1632–1633)
 Prince Friedrich of Schleswig-Holstein-Gottorp (1635–1654)
 Prince Adolf Gustav of Schleswig-Holstein-Gottorp (1637)
 Prince Johann Georg of Schleswig-Holstein-Gottorp, Prince Bishop of Lübeck (1638–1655)
 Christian Albert, Duke of Schleswig-Holstein-Gottorp (1641–1695)
 Frederick IV, Duke of Schleswig-Holstein-Gottorp (1671–1702)
 Charles Frederick, Duke of Schleswig-Holstein-Gottorp (1700–1739)
 Emperor Peter III of Russia (1728–1762)
 Emperor Paul I of Russia (1728–1762)
 Emperor Alexander I of Russia (1777–1825)
 Grand Duke Konstantin Pavlovich of Russia (1779–1831)
 Emperor Nicholas I of Russia (1796-1855)
 Emperor Alexander II of Russia (1818-1881)
Grand Duke Nicholas Alexandrovich of Russia (1843-1865)
 Emperor Alexander III of Russia (1845-1894)
 Emperor Nicholas II of Russia (1868-1918)
 Gran Duke Alexei Nikolaevich of Russia (1904-1918)
 Grand Duke Alexander Alexandrovich of Russia (1869-1870)
 Grand Duke George Alexandrovich of Russia (1871-1899)
 Grand Duke Michael Alexandrovich of Russia (1878-1918)
 George Mikhailovich, Count Brasov (1910-1931)
 Grand Duke Vladimir Alexandrovich of Russia (1847–1909)
 Grand Duke Alexander Vladimirovich of Russia (1875-1877) 
 Grand Duke Cyril Vladimirovich of Russia (1876-1938)
 Grand Duke Vladimir Kirillovich of Russia (1917-1992)
 Grand Duke Boris Vladimirovich of Russia (1877-1943)
 Grand Duke Andrei Vladimirovich of Russia (1879-1956)
 Prince Vladimir Romanovsky-Krasinsky (1902-1974)
 Grand Duke Alexei Alexandrovich of Russia (1850–1908)
 Count Alexei Alexeevich Belevsky-Zhukovsky (1871-1931)
 Count Sergei Alexeevich Belevsky-Zhukovsky (1903-1956)
 Grand Duke Sergei Alexandrovich of Russia (1857-1905)
 Grand Duke Paul Alexandrovich of Russia (1860-1919)
 Grand Duke Dmitri Pavlovich of Russia (1891-1941)
 Prince Paul Dimitrievich Romanovsky-Ilyinsky (1928-2004)
 Prince Dimitri Pavlovich Romanovsky-Ilyinsky (b. 1954)
 Prince Michael Pavlovich Romanovsky-Ilyinsky (b. 1961)
 Prince Vladimir Pavlovich Paley (1897-1918)
 Prince George Alexandrovich Yurievsky (1872-1913)
 Prince Alexander Georgijevich Yurievsky (1900-1988)
 Prince George Alexandrovich Yurievsky (b. 1961)
 Prince Boris Alexandrovich Yurievsky (23 February – 11 April 1876)
 Grand Duke Konstantin Nikolayevich of Russia
 Grand Duke Nikolai Konstantinovich of Russia (1850-1918) 
 Prince Artemy Nikolaevich Romanovsky-Iskander (1883-1919)
 Prince Alexander Nikolaevich Romanovsky-Iskander (1889-1957)
 Prince Kyrill Alexandrovich Romanovsky-Iskander (1915-1992) 
 Grand Duke Konstantin Konstantinovich of Russia (1858-1915) 
 Prince John Konstantinovich of Russia (1886-1918)
 Prince Vsevolod Ivanovich of Russia (1914-1973)
 Prince Gabriel Constantinovich of Russia (1887-1955)
 Prince Constantine Constantinovich of Russia (1891-1918)
 Prince Oleg Konstantinovich of Russia (1892-1914)
 Prince Igor Konstantinovich of Russia (1894-1918)
 Prince George Konstantinovich of Russia (1903-1938)
 Grand Duke Dimitri Konstantinovich of Russia (1860-1919)
 Grand Duke Vyacheslav Konstantinovich of Russia (1862-1879)
 Grand Duke Nicholas Nikolaevich of Russia (1831–1891)
 Grand Duke Nicholas Nikolaevich of Russia (1856-1929)
 Grand Duke Peter Nikolaevich of Russia (1864-1931)
 Prince Roman Petrovich of Russia (1896-1978)
 Prince Nicholas Romanovich (1922-2014)
 Prince Nicholas Romanovich (1926-2016)
 Grand Duke Michael Nicolaevich of Russia (1832-1909)
 Grand Duke Nicholas Mikhailovich of Russia (1859–1919)
 Grand Duke Michael Mikhailovich of Russia (1861–1929)
 Count Michael de Torby (1898-1959)
 Grand Duke George Mikhailovich of Russia (1863–1919)
 Grand Duke Alexander Mikhailovich of Russia (1866-1933)
 Prince Andrew Alexandrovich of Russia (1897-1981)
 Prince Michael Andreevich (1920-2008)
 Prince Andrew Andreevich (1923-2021)
 Prince Alexis Andreevich (b. 1953)
 Prince Peter Andreevich (b. 1961)
 Prince Andrew Andreevich (b. 1963)
 Prince Feodor Alexandrovich of Russia (1898–1968) 
 Prince Michael Feodorovich (1924-2008)
 Prince Michael Mikhailovich (1959-2001)
 Prince Nikita Alexandrovich of Russia (1900–1974)
 Prince Nikita Nikitich (1923-2007)
 Prince Feodor Nikitich (1974-2007)
 Prince Alexander Nikitich (1929-2002)
 Prince Dmitri Alexandrovich (1901-1980)
 Prince Rostislav Alexandrovich of Russia (1902-1978)
 Prince Rostislav Rostislavovich (1938-1999)
 Prince Rostislav Rostislavovich (b. 1985) Prince Rostislav Rostislavovich (b. 2013) Prince Nikita Rostislavovich (b. 1987) Prince Nicholas Rostislavovich (1945-2000)
 Prince Nicholas Nicolaevich (b. 1968) Prince Cory Nicolaevich (1994-1998)
 Prince Daniel Nicolaevich (b. 1972)
 Prince Vasili Alexandrovich of Russia (1907–1989)
 Grand Duke Sergei Mikhailovich of Russia (1869–1918)
 Grand Duke Alexei Mikhailovich of Russia (1875–1895)
 Grand Duke Michael Pavlovich of Russia (1798–1849)
 Prince Christian August of Schleswig-Holstein-Gottorp (1673-1726)
 Charles Augustus of Schleswig-Holstein-Gottorp, Prince Bishop of Lübeck (1706–1727)
 King Adolf Frederick of Sweden (1710-1771)
 King Gustav III of Sweden (1746–1792)
 King Gustav IV Adolf of Sweden (1778–1837)
 Prince Gustav of Sweden (1799–1877)
 Prince Charles Gustav, Duke of Småland (1782–1783) 
 King Charles XIII of Sweden (1748–1818)
 Charles Adolf, Duke of Värmland (1798)
 Prince Frederick Adolf, Duke of Östergötland (1750–1803)
 Frederick Augustus I, Duke of Oldenburg (1711–1785)
 William, Duke of Oldenburg (1754–1823)
 Prince William Christian of Schleswig-Holstein-Gottorp (1716–1719)
 Prince Frederick Conrad of Schleswig-Holstein-Gottorp (1718)
 Prince George Ludwig of Schleswig-Holstein-Gottorp (1719-1763)
 Prince Frederick of Schleswig-Holstein-Gottorp (1751-1752)
 Prince William of Schleswig-Holstein-Gottorp (1753-1772)
 Peter I, Grand Duke of Oldenburg (1755-1829)
 Augustus, Grand Duke of Oldenburg (1783-1853)
 Peter II, Grand Duke of Oldenburg (1827-1900)
 Frederick Augustus II, Grand Duke of Oldenburg (1852-1931)
 Nikolaus, Duke of Oldenburg (1897-1970)
 Anton Günther, Duke of Oldenburg (1923-2014)
 Christian, Duke of Oldenburg (b. 1955)
 Prince Alexander of Oldenburg (b. 1990)
 Prince Philipp of Oldenburg (b. 1991)
 Prince Anton Friedrich of Oldenburg (b. 1993)
 Prince Peter Friedrich of Oldenburg (1926-2016)
 Prince Friedrich August of Oldenburg (b. 1952)
 Prince Nikolaus of Oldenburg (b. 1955)
 Prince Christoph of Oldenburg (b. 1985)
 Prince Georg of Oldenburg (b. 1990)
 Prince Oscar of Oldenburg (b. 1991)
 Prince Georg Moritz of Oldenburg (b. 1957)
 Prince Egilmar Friedrich of Oldenburg (1934-2013)
 Prince Friedrich August of Oldenburg (1936–2017)
 Prince Paul-Wladimir of Oldenburg (b. 1969)
 Prince Kirill of Oldenburg (b. 2002)
 Prince Carlos of Oldenburg (b. 2004)
 Prince Paul of Oldenburg (b. 2005)
 Prince Huno of Oldenburg (b. 1940)
 Prince Johann of Oldenburg (b. 1940)
 Prince Konstantin Nikolaus of Oldenburg (b. 1975)
 Prince Frederick Augustus of Oldenburg (1917)
 Prince George Ludwig of Oldenburg (1855–1939)
 Prince Alexander Frederick of Oldenburg (1834–1835)
 Prince August Nicholas of Oldenburg (1836–1837)
 Prince Elimar Anthony of Oldenburg (1844–1895)
 Count Gustav Gregor Alexander of Welsburg (1878–1927)
 Count Georg Elimar Albrecht of Welsburg (1906–1984)
 Count Alexander Thankmar Paul of Welsburg (b. 1938)
 Count Christian Alosius Percy of Welsburg (b. 1939)
 Count Alexander Anton Gustav of Welsburg (1908–1945)
 Count Percy Friedrich of Welsburg (1913–1994) 
 Count Patrick Hubert of Welsburg (b. 1943)
 Duke George of Oldenburg|Prince George of Oldenburg(1784–1812)
 Prince Peter Paul Alexander of Oldenburg (1810–1829)
 Prince Peter Constantine Frederick of Oldenburg (1812–1881) 
 Prince Nicholas of Oldenburg (1840–1886)
 Prince Alexander of Oldenburg (1844–1932)
 Prince Peter of Oldenburg (1868–1924)
 Prince George of Oldenburg (1848–1871)
 Prince Constantine of Oldenburg (1850–1906)
 Count Nikolai Konstantinovich of Zarnekau (1886–1976)
 Count Aleksai Konstantinovich of Zarnekau (1887–1918)
 Count Petr Konstantinovich of Zarnekau (1889–1961)
 Count Konstantin Petrovich of Zarnekau (1916–1977) 
 Count Petr Konstantinovich of Zarnekau (b. 1948)
 Count Nikolai Petrovich of Zarnekau (b. 1968)
 Prince Gustav Ulrich of Schleswig-Holstein-Gottorp (1642–1642)
 Prince August Friedrich of Schleswig-Holstein-Gottorp, Prince Bishop of Lübeck (1646–1705)
 Prince Adolf of Schleswig-Holstein-Gottorp (1647)
 Prince Adolf of Schleswig-Holstein-Gottorp (1600–1631)
 Prince John of Schleswig-Holstein-Gottorp, Prince Bishop of Lübeck (1606–1655)
 Prince Julius Adolf Friedrich of Schleswig-Holstein-Gottorp (1643–1644)
 Prince Johann Julius Friedrich of Schleswig-Holstein-Gottorp (1646–1647)
 Prince Johann August of Schleswig-Holstein-Gottorp (1647–1686)
 Prince Christian of Schleswig-Holstein-Gottorp (1609)
 Prince John Frederick of Schleswig-Holstein-Gottorp, Prince Archbishop of Bremen and Prince Bishop of Lübeck and Verden
 Prince Frederick of Denmark, Prince Archbishop of Hildesheim and Bishop of Schleswig (1529-1556)
 Maurice III, Count of Oldenburg–Delmenhorst (1428–1464)
 Jakob, Count of Oldenburg–Delmenhorst (1463–1483)
 Gerhard VI, Count of Oldenburg (1428–1464)
 Gerhard of Oldenburg (1454–1470)
 Dietrich of Oldenburg (1456–1463)
 Adolph, Count of Oldenburg-Delmenhorst (1458–1500)
 Christian of Oldenburg (1459–1492)
 John V, Count of Oldenburg (1460–1526)
 John VI, Count of Oldenburg (1501–1548)
 George, Count of Oldenburg (1503–1551)
 Christopher, Count of Oldenburg, Canon of Bremen and Cologne (1504–1566)
 Anthony I, Count of Oldenburg (1505–1573
 John VII, Count of Oldenburg (1540–1603)
 Johann Friedrich of Oldenburg (1578–1580)
 Anthony Günther, Count of Oldenburg (1583–1667)
 Christian, Canon of Cologne (1544–1570)
 Anthony II, Count of Oldenburg-Delmenhorst (1550–1619)
 Anthony Henry, Count of Oldenburg-Delmenhorst (1604–1622)
 Christian IX, Count of Oldenburg-Delmenhorst (1612–1647) 
 Maurice of Oldenburg
 Otto of Oldenburg, Canon of Bremen and Cologne (1464–1500)
 Conrad II, Count of Oldenburg (1342–1401)
 Johann of Oldenburg († 1393)
 Maurice II, Count of Oldenburg (1381–1420)
 Christian of Oldenburg († 1314)
 Otto of Oldenburg, Prince Archbishop of Bremen (1286–1348)
 Maurice of Oldenburg († 1319)
 Otto II, Count of Oldenburg–Delmenhorst (1250–1304)
 Johann I, Count of Oldenburg–Delmenhorst (1294–1347)
 Christian, Count of Oldenburg–Delmenhorst (1335–1367)
 Otto IV, Count of Oldenburg–Delmenhorst (1367–1418)
 Nicholas, Count of Oldenburg–Delmenhorst, Prince Archbishop of Bremen († 1217)
 Johann of Oldenburg–Delmenhorst († 1354)
 Bernhard of Oldenburg-Delmenhorst, Canon of Hildesheim
 Johann of Oldenburg-Delmenhorst, Canon of Minden
 Christian I, Count of Oldenburg–Delmenhorst (1294–1355)
 Otto III, Count of Oldenburg–Delmenhorst (1337–1374)
 Wertslaw of Oldenburg–Delmenhorst, Canon of Verden († 1379)
 Johann of Oldenburg–Delmenhorst, Canon of Cologne
 Christian of Oldenburg–Delmenhorst, Canon of Bremen 
 Otto of Oldenburg, Abbot of St. Paul in Bremen (1204–1285)
 Christian of Oldenburg († 1192)
 Otto of Oldenburg (1130–1184)

Family tree focused on agnatic male descendants born out of wedlock, therefore legitimized or illegitimate, of Elimar I, Count of Oldenburg:

 Elimar I, Count of Oldenburg (1040–1108)
 Elimar II, Count of Oldenburg (1070–1142)
 Christian I, Count of Oldenburg († 1167)
 Maurice, Count of Oldenburg (1145–1211)
 Christian II, Count of Oldenburg (1184–1233)
 John I, Count of Oldenburg (1204–1270)
 Christian III, Count of Oldenburg (1234–1285)
 John II, Count of Oldenburg (1272–1315)
 Conrad I, Count of Oldenburg (1300–1347)
 Christian V, Count of Oldenburg (1342–1399)
 Dietrich, Count of Oldenburg (1390–1440)
 King Christian I of Denmark (1426–1481)
 King Frederick I of Denmark (1471–1533)
 King Christian III of Denmark (1503–1559)
 King Frederick II of Denmark (1534–1588)
 King Christian IV of Denmark (1577–1648)
 King Frederick III of Denmark (1577–1648)
 Ulrik Frederik Gyldenløve, Count of Løvendal (1638–1704)
 Count Carl Danneskiold-Løvendal (1660-1689)
 Count Woldemar Danneskiold-Løvendal (1660–1740)
 Count Ulrich Friedrich Danneskiold-Løvendal (1694–1754)
 Count Ulrich Friedrich Woldemar Danneskiold-Løvendal (1700–1755)
 Count Woldemar Henrik Danneskiold-Løvendal (1723-1724)
 Count Frederik Woldemar Danneskiold-Løvendal (1724-1740)
 Count Franz Xaver Danneskiold-Løvendal (1742–1808)
 Count Carl Woldemar Danneskiold-Løvendal (1773–1829)
 Count Ulrik Frederik Danneskiold-Laurvig (1678)
 Count Christian Anton Danneskiold-Laurvig (1679-1679)
 Count Frederik Christian Danneskiold-Laurvig (1681-1696)
 Ferdinand Anton Gyldenløve, Count of Laurvig (1688–1754)
 Count Frederik Ludwig Danneskiold-Laurvig (1717–1762)
 Count Christian Frederik Danneskiold-Laurvig (1717–1762)
 Count Ulrich Ferdinand Danneskiold-Laurvig (1720)
 Count Christian Conrad Danneskiold-Laurvig (1723–1783)
 King Christian V of Denmark (1646–1699)
 King Frederick IV of Denmark (1646–1699)
 King Christian VI of Denmark (1646–1699)
 King Frederick V of Denmark (1723–1766)
 Ulrik Frederik de Hansen (1751–1752)
 Frederik Gyldenløve (1704–1705)
 Christian Gyldenløve, Count of Samsøe (1674–1703)
 Count Christian Danneskiold-Samsøe (1702-1728)  
 Count Frederik Christian Danneskiold-Samsøe (1722-1778)
 Count Christian Conrad Danneskiold-Samsøe (1774-1823)
 Count Frederik Christian Danneskiold-Samsøe (1798-1869)
 Count Christian Conrad Sophus Danneskiold-Samsøe (1800-1886)
 Count Christian Danneskiold-Samsøe (1838-1914)
 Count Christian Emil Robert Danneskiold-Samsøe (1884-1886)
 Count Aage Conrad Danneskiold-Samsøe (1886-1945)
 Count Christian Ernest Danneskiold-Samsøe (1840-1908)
 Count Magnus Otto Sophus Danneskiold-Samsøe (1804-1894)
Count Christian Conrad Sophus Danneskiold-Samsøe (1836-1908)
 Count Christian Valdemar Danneskiold-Samsøe (1864-1931)
 Count James Christian Carl Sophus Danneskiold-Samsøe (1900-1966)
  Count Valdemar Dale Danneskiold-Samsøe (1935-2016)
 Count Mikkel Archibald Valdemar Christian Danneskiold-Samsøe (b. 1971)
 Count Frederik Valdemar Mikkel Hannibal Danneskiold-Samsøe (b. 1985)
 Count Christian Valdemar Gustav Mikkel Danneskiold-Samsøe (b. 1987)
 Count Kevin Christopher Christian Mikkel Danneskiold-Samsøe (b. 1990)
 Count Sofus Charles Valdemar Mikkel Danneskiold-Samsøe (b. 1992)
 Count Oliver James Mikkel Alexander Danneskiold-Samsøe (2000-2016)
 Count Viggo Danneskiold-Samsøe (1874-1936)
 Count Knud Danneskiold-Samsøe (1900-1969)
 Count Hans Christian Erik Viggo Danneskiold-Samsøe (1915-1975)
 Count Carl Christian Erik Leopold Danneskiold-Samsøe (b. 1945)
 Count Frederik Jost Conrad Erling Danneskiold-Samsøe (b.  1946)
 Count Christian Jürg Heinrich Caspar Danneskiold-Samsøe (b. 1951)
 Count Kaj Ulf Carl Johan Danneskiold-Samsøe (b. 1959)
 Count Ulrik Otto Hubert Viggo Danneskiold-Samsøe (b. 1965)
 Count Philip Christian Ulrik Manuel Danneskiold-Samsøe (b. 1989)
 Count Niklas Christian Sophus Laszlo Danneskiold-Samsøe (b. 1990)
 Count Niels Frederik Kjeld Viggo Danneskiold-Samsøe (1916-1994)
 Count Ulrik Christian Lauritz Danneskiold-Samsøe (b. 1945)
 Count Niels Danneskiold-Samsøe (b. 1982)
 Count Otto Frederik Aage Danneskiold-Samsøe (b. 1947)
 Count Rolf Danneskiold-Samsøe (b. 1976)
 Count Helge Danneskiold-Samsøe (b. 1981)
 Count Kjeld Viggo Gerhard Danneskiold-Samsøe (b. 1952)
 Count Oluf Erling Christoffer Viggo Danneskiold-Samsøe (1917) 
 Count Ubbe Eyvind Gregers Sophus Viggo Danneskiold-Samsøe (1921-1978)
 Count Jakob Frederik Christian Danneskiold-Samsøe (b. 1968)
 Count Julius Valentin Danneskiold-Samsøe (b. 1991)
 Count Johan Conrad Sophus Danneskiold-Samsøe (b. 1970)
 Count Valdemar August Theodor Danneskiold-Samsøe (b. 2008)
 Count Vilfred Arthur Cornelius Danneskiold-Samsøe (b. 2012)
 Count Knud Danneskiold-Samsøe (1876-1957) 
 Count Frederik Vilhelm Steen Danneskiold-Samsøe (1837-1895)
 Count Frederik Sophus Christian Ludvig Danneskiold-Samsøe (1864-1944)
 Count Einar Carl Otto Danneskiold-Samsøe (1868-1908)
 Count Axel Edzard Ernest Danneskiold-Samsøe (1871-1925)
 Count Palle Julian Danneskiold-Samsøe (1906-1968)
 Count Thomas Godske Danneskiold-Samsøe (b. 1946)
 Count Mikkel Frederik Danneskiold-Samsøe (b. 1985)
 Count Otto Ludvig August Balthazar Danneskiold-Samsøe (1841-1896)
 Count Adam Sophus Danneskiold-Samsøe (1874-1961)
 Count Adam Otto Danneskiold-Samsøe (1910-1981)
 Count Bent Otto Aksel Danneskiold-Samsøe (b. 1943)
 Count Adam Peter Wilhelm Danneskiold-Samsøe (b. 1946)
 Count Ludvig Danneskiold-Samsøe (1926-1990)
 Count Ulrik Adolph Danneskiold-Samsøe (1723-1751)
 Count Friedrich Danneskiold-Samsøe  (1703–1770)
 Count Christian Ulrich Danneskiold-Samsøe (1725-1726)
 Ulrik Christian Gyldenløve, Count of Samsø (1678–1719)
 Christian Ulrik Gyldenløve (1611–1640)
 Hans Ulrik Gyldenløve (1615–1645)
 Christian Ulrik Gyldenløve (1630–1658)
 Adolf, Duke of Schleswig-Holstein-Gottorp (1526–1586)
 Duke of Schleswig-Holstein-Gottorp (1575–1616)
 John Adolf, Duke of Schleswig-Holstein-Gottorp (1597–1659)
 Christian Albert, Duke of Schleswig-Holstein-Gottorp (1641–1695)
 Frederick IV, Duke of Schleswig-Holstein-Gottorp (1671–1702)
 Charles Frederick, Duke of Schleswig-Holstein-Gottorp (1700–1739)
 Emperor Peter III of Russia (1728–1762)
 Emperor Paul I of Russia (1728–1762)
 Emperor Nicholas I of Russia (1796-1855)
 Grand Duke Nicholas Nikolaevich of Russia (1831–1891)
 Vladimir Nikolaevich Nikolaev (1873–1942) with issue
 Nicholas Nikolaevich Nikolaev (1875–1902) with issue
 Gerhard VI, Count of Oldenburg (1428–1464)
 John V, Count of Oldenburg (1460–1526)
 Anthony I, Count of Oldenburg (1505–1573
 John VII, Count of Oldenburg (1540–1603)
 Anthony Günther, Count of Oldenburg (1583–1667)
 Anton I, Imperial Count of Aldenburg (1633–1680)
 Anton II, Imperial Count of Aldenburg (1681–1738)

See also
House of Oldenburg
List of members of the House of Schleswig-Holstein-Sonderburg-Glücksburg

References